Destino  is a drama anthology television series that premiered on the Brazilian branch of the HBO Latin America. The series was produced by O2 Filmes, and directed by Alex Gabassi and Fábio Mendonça. It first aired on November 25, 2012.

The series consists of episodes focusing on the lives of immigrants in the Brazilian cities of São Paulo, Rio de Janeiro and Salvador. Each episode follows the life of a different group, portraying the frustrations, joys, and culture shock they face daily. Most of the characters are played by immigrants who were selected for the production, playing with their native language.

Episodes

Season 1: Destino: São Paulo (2012)

Season 2: Destino: Rio de Janeiro (2013)

Season 3: Destino: Salvador (2018)

See also
 Immigration to Brazil

References

External links
 Official page at HBO 
 

Brazilian anthology television series
Brazilian drama television series
Portuguese-language HBO original programming
Spanish-language HBO original programming
HBO Latin America original programming
2010s Brazilian television series
2012 Brazilian television series debuts
Television shows filmed in São Paulo (state)
Television shows set in Rio de Janeiro (city)
Television shows set in Salvador
Television shows set in São Paulo
Portuguese-language television shows